Aashiq Ali Mikrani was one of the thirty Madheshi martyrs of the Terai/Madhes movement of 2007 and 2008. He was killed during the madhesh movement in 2007, along with 26 others, while 6 more were killed in the second madhesh movement agitation of 2008.

The government of Nepal declared those killed during the agitations as martyrs, as per the agreement with the United Democratic Madhesi Front on 10 March 2008.

Early life
He was born in Malangawa Municipality-4 of Sarlahi District. He was born as a son of Abdul Wahab Mikrani and Roshan Ara Mikrani and at the time of martyr he was 16.

Martyr day
On 4 February 2007, during first Madheshi agitation, he was representing the activists of Madhesi People's Rights Forum. Because of the clash between the agitating activists and the police in Malangawa of Sarlahi district took his life.

The police resorted to firing after he staged demonstration defying the curfew with Ram Narayan Shah of Salempur Village Development Committee (VDC).

References

Year of birth missing
2007 deaths
People from Malangwa
Madhesi people
Deaths by firearm in Nepal
2007 in Nepal
Mikrani People of Nepal